Prescott Township is one of twelve townships in Adams County, Iowa, USA.  At the 2010 census, its population was 424.

Prescott Township was formed in 1873 from the formerly named Queen City Township, to which a portion of Quincy Township was also annexed.

Geography
According to the USGS, it contains four cemeteries: Evergreen, Icarian, Mount Pleasant and Old Evergreen.

References

External links
 US-Counties.com
 City-Data.com

Townships in Adams County, Iowa
Townships in Iowa